KALP (92.7 FM) is a country music-formatted radio station licensed to serve the Alpine, Texas, area. Broadcasting from studios located at Kokernot Field, the station is under ownership of Martin and Patricia Benevich, through licensee Alpine Radio, LLC.

The station is an affiliate of the Dallas Cowboys radio network.

References

External links
KALP official website

ALP
Country radio stations in the United States
Radio stations established in 1992